The Inter-Pacific Bar Association or IPBA is an international association of business and commercial lawyers, founded in 1991. Its members consist of residents of the Asia-Pacific region, or lawyers with a strong interest in that region. It brings together lawyers from different backgrounds and legal systems and fosters communication and builds stronger ties between these lawyers and thus their countries.

It was founded in April 1991 at an initial conference in Tokyo attended by 500 lawyers. The association has since grown to over 1,200 members from 65 countries and jurisdictions, such as Australia, China, Singapore, India, the United States and Japan.

Through its IPBA Scholars program the Association brings young lawyers and lawyers from developing countries to its annual conferences and thus helps to ensure the continued development of the legal profession in the region.

The IPBA is open to practicing attorneys anywhere in the world interested in the Asia-Pacific region.

Former presidents 
 2019-2020 Francis Xavier, Singapore
 2018–2019 Perry Pe, The Philippines
 2017–2018 Denis McNamara, New Zealand
 2016–2017 Dhinesh Bhaskaran, Malaysia
 2015–2016 Kwai Huen Wong, Hong Kong
 2014–2015 William Scott, Canada
 2013–2014 Young-Moo Shin, Korea
 2012–2013 Lalit Bhasin, India
 2011–2012 Shiro Kuniya, Japan
 2010–2011 Lee Suet-Fern, Singapore
 2009–2010 Rafael A. Morales, The Philippines
 2008–2009 Gerold W. Libby, United States
 2007–2008 Gao Zongze, China
 2006–2007 James McH. FitzSimons, Australia
 2005–2006 Felix O. Soebagjo, Indonesia
 2004–2005 Sang-Kyu Rhi, Korea
 2003–2004 Ravinder Nath, India
 2002–2003 Vivien Chan, Hong Kong
 2001–2002 Nobuo Miyake, Japan
 2000–2001 John W. Craig, Canada
 1999–2000 Dej-Udom Krairit, Thailand
 1998–1999 Susan Glazebrook, New Zealand
 1997–1998 Cecil Abraham, Malaysia
 1996–1997 Teodoro D. Regala, The Philippines
 1995–1996 Carl E. Anduri, Jr., United States
 1994–1995 Pathmanaban Selvadurai, Singapore
 1993–1994 Ming-Sheng Lin, Taiwan 
 1992–1993 Richard James Marshall, Switzerland
 1991–1992 Kunio Hamada, Japan

References

External links 
 IPBA Homepage

Bar associations